Mangalya Bandhana is a 1993 Indian Kannada-language romantic drama film directed and produced by S. K. Bhagavan and written by P. Vasu. The film stars Ananth Nag, Malashri and Moon Moon Sen with Marthaanda, K. S. Ashwath and Ramesh Bhat in key supporting roles. The film's music was composed by Hamsalekha. The film was a remake of Tamil film Purusha Lakshanam (1993).

Cast 
Ananth Nag
Malashri 
Moon Moon Sen
Marthaanda
K. S. Ashwath
Ramesh Bhat
Tennis Krishna
Mynavathi
M. S. Umesh
Smitha
Shanthamma
Honnavalli Krishna
Bhagyashri
Thimmayya

Soundtrack 
The music of the film was composed and lyrics written by Hamsalekha.

References 

1993 films
1990s Kannada-language films
Indian romantic drama films
Kannada remakes of Tamil films
Films scored by Hamsalekha
1993 romantic drama films
Films directed by S. K. Bhagavan